2139 Makharadze, provisional designation , is a rare-type Nysa asteroid from the inner region of the asteroid belt, approximately  in diameter. It was discovered on 30 June 1970, by Russian astronomer Tamara Smirnova at the Crimean Astrophysical Observatory in Nauchnyj.

Orbit and classification 

Makharadze belongs to the Nysa family of asteroids. It orbits the Sun in the inner main-belt at a distance of 2.0–2.9 AU once every 3 years and 10 months (1,411 days). Its orbit has an eccentricity of 0.19 and an inclination of 2° with respect to the ecliptic.

Physical characteristics 

In the Tholen classification, Makharadze is a F-type asteroid. It has a rotation period of 11.9759 hours with a brightness variation of 0.38 magnitude.

Naming 

This minor planet was named after the Georgian city of Ozurgeti, formerly known as Makharadze. Makharadze is the twin city of Genichesk, Tamara Smirnova's Ukrainian birthplace. The approved naming citation was published on 8 February 1982.

References 
 

 Pravec, P.; Wolf, M.; Sarounova, L. (2005) http://www.asu.cas.cz/~ppravec/neo.htm
 Pray, D.P.; Galad, A.; Gajdos, S.; Kornos, L.; et al. (2006) Minor Planet Bul. 33, 26.

External links 
 Asteroid Lightcurve Database (LCDB), query form (info )
 Dictionary of Minor Planet Names, Google books
 Asteroids and comets rotation curves, CdR – Observatoire de Genève, Raoul Behrend
 Discovery Circumstances: Numbered Minor Planets (1)-(5000) – Minor Planet Center
 
 

002139
Discoveries by Tamara Mikhaylovna Smirnova
Named minor planets
2139 Makharadze
002139
19700630